In the 1938–39 season, USM Alger is competing in the Third Division for the 2nd season French colonial era, as well as the Forconi Cup. They will be competing in Second Division, and the Forconi Cup.'''

Competitions

Overview

Third Division

League table

Group II

Matches

Ranking match

Promotion play-offs

References

External links
 L'Echo d'Alger : journal républicain du matin

USM Alger seasons
Algerian football clubs 1938–39 season